Francis Carter may refer to:

Francis Carter (priest) (1851–1935), Anglican priest
Francis Carter (sawmiller) (1869–1949), New Zealand sawmiller
Francis B. Carter (1861–1937), Justice of the Florida Supreme Court

See also
Frank Carter (disambiguation)
Francis Lovett Carter-Cotton (1843–1919), Canadian newspaperman, politician, and businessman